Peter Keane (born 1971) is an Irish Gaelic football manager and former player who, most recently, managed the Kerry senior football team. As a player, he lined out with South Kerry Championship club St Mary's.

Keane is one of nine children. Both of his parents ran the Ringside Rest Hotel in Cahersiveen. His father Tom was a builder who spent time as chairman of the South Kerry board. Peter Keane played football in the late 1980s and early 1990s. He played for St Mary's alongside fellow forward Maurice Fitzgerald. In 1988, the pair won a Kerry under-21 title for South Kerry. However, his county career was limited to minor (1989), county junior (1990) and under-21 (captaining the 1992 team to a Munster title).

He spent four years working in a bank before departing to work in retail in Killorglin. He is considered shrewd. In 2009, he managed Beaufort's junior footballers past his own St Mary's club in the county semi-final and led them to victory over Dromid in the final. He began managing his native club St Mary's in 2010, travelling down from Killorglin especially to do so, and led them to victory in the South Kerry final. Keane's younger brother Ray was playing for the team, this before his own foray into management with St Finbarr's. After leading St Mary's to the 2011 All-Ireland Junior Club Football Championship, Keane joined Kerry's youth development system and managed the Kerry under-16s. County minor manager Mickey O'Sullivan brought him in as a selector in 2011, telling The Kerryman newspaper: "Nobody knows more than Peter does". This was accidental, only coming about because Seán O'Sullivan left a vacancy by coming out of retirement to play for Kerry.

Keane stayed with the Kerry minor team for two years before joining the Killarney-based Legion club as its manager. He led Legion to the final of the Kerry Senior Football Championship in 2015, the club's first since 1946, and experienced a narrow loss. He then managed the Kerry minor team to three consecutive All-Ireland titles between 2016 and 2018. Following the resignation of Kerry senior manager Éamonn Fitzmaurice after the county's loss to Kildare in the 2018 All-Ireland Senior Football Championship, Keane was approached to succeed Fitzmaurice. He did so, and recalled Tommy Walsh, Jonathan Lyne and Jack Sherwood to the county team in his first season, and also bringing in Tommy Griffin and Jason Foley from the minor team, as well as old club-mate Maurice Fitzgerald. Kerry were beaten only twice in the 2019 National Football League (both times by Mayo, including the final), and took Dublin to a replay of the 2019 All-Ireland Senior Football Championship Final.

After losing to Cork in the 2020 Munster Senior Football Championship semi-final, Keane climbed Carrauntoohil; there he fell and was rescued by helicopter, requiring surgery on his shoulder after being airlifted to hospital. Keane spoke about the incident ahead of his county's 2021 National Football League opening game against Galway, saying: "I had a very innocuous fall, it was just a slip, and I put my hand back to save myself and unfortunately I dislocated my shoulder".

Honours

Player
Kerry
Munster Under-21 Football Championship (1): 1992
Munster Minor Football Championship (1): 1989

Manager
St Mary's
All-Ireland Junior Club Football Championship (1): 2011
Munster Junior Club Football Championship (1): 2010
Kerry Junior Football Championship (1): 2010

Kerry
Munster Senior Football Championship (1): 2019
All-Ireland Minor Football Championship (3): 2016, 2017, 2018
Munster Minor Football Championship (3): 2016, 2017, 2018

References

1971 births
Living people
Gaelic football forwards
Gaelic football managers
Gaelic football selectors
Kerry inter-county Gaelic footballers
People from Cahersiveen
St Mary's (Kerry) Gaelic footballers